Rex Norman (1891–1961) was an Australian rugby league footballer and cricketer, who represented Australasia in rugby league and New South Wales in both sports.

Rugby league career
Norman played 13 seasons in first grade in the NSWRFL, playing for Annandale between 1910 and 1914, South Sydney between 1915-1917 and 1919, and Eastern Suburbs Roosters in 1918, and 1920–1922. He was one of four brothers along, with Bernard, Roy and Ray, who played in the NSW Rugby Football League first-grade competition. Rex and Ray became only the second set of brothers to represent Australia, behind Viv and Bill Farnsworth. Rex was selected for Australasia for the 1921–22 Kangaroo tour of Great Britain. He played in 21 tour matches but did not play a test match.

Norman was the NSW Rugby Football League's top point scorer in 1921.

Cricket career
Norman also played first-class cricket for New South Wales, appearing in seven matches from 1918 to 1920. A left-arm fast-medium bowler, he took 31 wickets at 26.83.

Later years
Norman finished his long career in Canowindra, New South Wales, captain-coaching both the local rugby league team and cricket team.

In 1953 Norman coached the NSW Country Rugby League Firsts side to a 28-27 victory over City Firsts.

References

Australian rugby league players
Sydney Roosters players
South Sydney Rabbitohs players
Annandale rugby league players
Australian cricketers
New South Wales cricketers
1891 births
1961 deaths
Australasia rugby league team players
Cricketers from Sydney
Rugby league fullbacks
Rugby league wingers
Rugby league centres
Rugby league players from Sydney
South Sydney Rabbitohs captains